Kola Real ("Royal Cola" or "Real Cola") is one of the most popular brands of Ajegroup, a leader in the Latin American beverage market. Started by the Añaños Family es in Ayacucho, Peru on June 23, 1988, the company has grown and expanded not only in Peru, but also in Cuba, Ecuador, Dominican Republic, Venezuela, Costa Rica, El Salvador, Mexico, Colombia, Brazil, Honduras, Nicaragua, Panama, Thailand and Egypt . Kola Real is available in many flavours such as "revolution red" (strawberry), orange, pineapple, lime-lemon, "negra" ("black", similar to Coca-Cola) and "dorada" ("golden", similar to Inca Kola).
In Nigeria, Honduras, Mexico, Costa Rica, Colombia, Panama, Venezuela, Ecuador, Indonesia, Thailand and Egypt , Kola Real "negra" is known as Big Cola.

See also

 List of soft drinks by country

References

External links
Kola Real Takes on Coca-Cola

Cola brands
Peruvian drinks
Products introduced in 1988
Ajegroup brands